A soldering station is a multipurpose power soldering device designed for electronic components soldering. This type of equipment is mostly used in electronics and electrical engineering. Soldering station consists of one or more soldering tools connected to the main unit, which includes the controls (temperature adjustment), means of indication, and may be equipped with an electric transformer. Soldering stations may include some accessories – holders and stands, soldering tip cleaners, etc. 

Soldering stations are widely used in electronics repair workshops, electronic laboratories, in industry. Sometimes simple soldering stations are used for household applications and for hobbies.

Soldering Station Components 

The main soldering station elements which determine its compatibilities are soldering tools. Different tools are used for different applications and soldering stations may be equipped with more than one of them at a time. The main tools for soldering are:
 contact soldering irons;
 desoldering tweezers or SMD hot tweezers;
 desoldering gun;
 hot air gun;
 infrared heater.

Soldering iron is the most common working tool of a soldering station. Some stations may use simultaneously several soldering irons to make the process quicker and more convenient, as there is no need to change the soldering tips or readjust the station or the soldering temperature. Some stations may use some specialized soldering irons, such as ultrasonic soldering irons or induction soldering irons.

Soldering Irons 

Soldering iron as a part of soldering station has a number of advantages.

Increased operability 
 The operator may set the temperature according to the solder alloy in use
 Stability of the preset temperature.
 Operation mode indication, including temperature display.

Better heating element quality

Main unit with power supply 
 Galvanic isolation of the heating element from the electricity network. This increases your own safety and protects the components you are soldering.
 Heating element operates under low voltage (10-30 V). It is good for safety. It prolongs the heating element lifetime as well. 
 Grounding of the whole unit.
 The station has a fuse.

Increased user comfort 
 The working part has smaller size and weight. 
 Station design integrates soldering aid accessories: soldering iron stands, soldering tip cleaners, etc.
 Some stations have auto switch-off function. 

However, most soldering stations can only be used on your desktop. Also, it costs more than just a separate soldering iron.

Desoldering Tools 

Desoldering is a very important stage in PCB repair. It is often needed to disassemble some components just to make sure they work or check their condition. That is why it is important to detach the elements without any possible damage to them. 

The means that may be integrated in soldering stations are:

SMD hot tweezers heat up and may not only melt the solder alloy but grab the needed component as well. They may have different types of tips for different applications. 

Desoldering iron is usually made in a shape of a gun. It is capable of taking in the air (vacuum pickup) and solder alloy. 

Non-contact heating tools include hot air and infrared heaters. They are used for SMT disassembling.

Hot Air Guns 

They use a hot air stream for heating up the components. Hot air is focused on the certain area using special hot air nozzles. Usually soldering hot air guns are capable of providing temperatures from 100 to 480 °C.

Infrared Heaters 
Soldering stations with infrared (IR) heaters are a separate type of soldering stations and differ a lot. Such stations provide high-precision soldering and the process is more like that in electronics industry.  The temperature profile may be set based on the components being soldered. This minimizes the risk of components deformation or damage due to the temperature difference.

Soldering Station Classification

Contact Soldering Stations 

This type requires a soldering iron equipped with an electronic temperature adjustment unit. The main technical parameter of the contact soldering station is the power. The power determines the operation convenience and soldering effectiveness. The modern stations have power from 10 to 200 W and more. The most common are the models with 50-80 W power. The higher is the power the more amount of heat you may transmit for the same time. It allows reducing the temperature on the heating element to the minimal possible value for melting the solder alloy.  And vice versa – the lower is the power the higher temperature you need to melt the solder. High temperature means a risk of a component overheating. Especially it concerns semiconductor components or electrolytic conductors.

According to the solder alloy used these soldering stations may be divided into two subtypes:

Tin/lead soldering stations

Lead-free soldering stations 
This type of stations is characterized by heating element with a power up to 160 W. Lead-free solder alloys need higher temperatures to be melted, so the station needs more power. If the station is equipped with a temperature regulator, it may be used for operation with a traditional lead-containing solder.

Digital and analogue soldering stations 

The stations may be divided into digital and analogue according to the control unit operation method. 

Analogue stations have a temperature stabilization that operates as follows:
 The heating element is working till the soldering tip reaches certain temperature, then the power switches off.
 When the temperature becomes lower than a certain level the heating element is on again and the soldering tip is being heated. 

The operation is ensured by the magnetoelectric relay. It is controlled by electronics and a temperature sensor. Analogue control system has an advantage – it is the cost. The disadvantage is a low operation precision that results in soldering tip overheating. This leads to problems like: electronic components overheating, often tip change. 

Digital soldering station is operating using a PID regulator that is controlled by a microprocessor. Digital control method is more precise.

Induction soldering stations 

Induction soldering stations are characterized by high power and excellent thermal stability. They use the technology of heating and thermal stabilization based on Curie temperature. 

American manufacturer Metcal is a leader in this market segment, however there are other brands.

Non-contact soldering stations

Infrared soldering stations

Hot air soldering stations 
Stations with hot air guns are used in cases when just a soldering iron is not enough. Disassembling microchips requires a hot air gun. SMD components soldering with hot air is much more convenient. Hot air guns usually come with special nozzles for hot air stream regulation. 
Popular manufacturers: Hakko, Quick, Accta, Goot, etc.

Rework systems 
For professional laptop, game console and other electronics repair, special repair systems are used. These repair systems usually combine several components: hot air gun, soldering iron, desoldering gun, etc. This equipment allows effective desoldering and soldering large BGAs. These operations require special approach and certain amount of process automation. 
The most popular manufacturers: Ersa, Martin, Jovy Systems, Quick, Scotle.

External links 

 How to Use a Soldering Station
 Everything about Soldering Station an Article by TMS Virdi
 Types of Smd Rework Station

See also 
 Soldering
 Soldering iron
 Soldering gun
 Solder

Soldering
Power tools